Black Cherry may refer to:

 Prunus serotina
 Dark-skinned cultivars of Prunus avium, such as Kordia cherry
 Black Cherry (Goldfrapp album), 2003
 Black Cherry (Goldfrapp song), 2003
 Black Cherry (Kumi Koda album), 2006
 Black Cherry (Rachel Stamp song), 2002
 Black Cherry (wrestler), a Japanese professional wrestler
 Black Cherry (band), a London, UK electronic indie band
 Black Cherry, a graphic novel by Doug TenNapel